Trek: The Movie is a 2018 comedy film. It was written and produced by David Howard (Galaxy Quest) and directed by Alan Peterson. The film is distributed by Excel Entertainment Group—the distributors of 17 Miracles, The Work and the Glory, and The Cokeville Miracle.

The film with a runtime of 120 mins follows a young Mormon teenager named Tom and his friends on their handcart journey. Along the way they try to smuggle in unsanctioned food, battle sibling rivalry, encounter a "special ops" Young Men's leader, match wits with a twinkie-loving skunk, and ponder doctrinal brain teasers like, "Do general Authorities go to PG-13 movies?" But, when they encounter unexpected trouble, their faith is tested much like their pioneer ancestors. The film depicts "Trek" as a sort of Mormon rite of passage.

Cast
The cast includes Joel Bishop (Saints and Soldiers), Clint Pulver (Saturday's Warrior), and Ali Durham (12 Gifts of Christmas).  

 Austin Grant - Tom Jensen
 Joel Bishop - Bob Pratt
 Stefania Barr - Anna McDowell
 Clint Pulver - Brad
 Ryan Brown - Sterling Bennett
 Spencer Loftus - Bobby Murray
 Avery Pizzutoo - Susan
 Spencer Marsh - Lehi Johnson 
 Duy Beck - White Water Rafter
 Michael Behrens - Jesse Crabbe
 T.J. Bishop - Bonfire Dancer #4
 Chris Equizabal - Mike Sandoval
 Bill Gillane - Grandpa
 Caden Gregoire - Kent Pratt
 Devin Hansen - Youth Leader
 Emily McLean - Washtub Bass Player
 Eric Millward - Trek Pa
 Cathy Tidwell - Trek Ma
 Allie Rae Treharne - Lisa
 AmberLee Wilson - Amanda Peterson

Music
The film includes music from local Utah bands including Shrink the Giant.

See also
 LDS cinema

References

External links

 

2018 films
Films shot in Utah
Mormon cinema
2010s English-language films
American adventure comedy films
2010s American films